The Cistern of Philoxenos, or Binbirdirek Cistern, is a man-made subterranean reservoir in Istanbul, situated between the Forum of Constantine and the Hippodrome of Constantinople in the Sultanahmet district. It has been restored and is now visited as a tourist attraction. The entrance is located at İmran Öktem Sokak 4.
Binbirdirek Cistern is the second largest cistern in Istanbul after the Basilica Cistern.

Construction

The reservoir has a surface area of 3640 m2, storing 40,000 m3 of water. The cistern is composed of a large hypostyle chamber supported by vaults.  The 224 columns, each 14 to 15 meters tall, are made of marble from nearby Marmara Island.  Each column is a superposition of two columns, joined by a marble ring.  The floor of the cistern was later reinforced, so that only the upper column and a short sleeve of the lower column are thus visible.  The original height can be seen in an excavated pond with four columns in the middle of the cistern. Most of the columns, and also the caps, are engraved with a Greek mason's mark.

Restoration
The cistern was restored by Justinian I in the 6th century, after the palace was completely destroyed in a fire in 475. After the conquest of the city by the Ottomans in 1453, the cistern fell into disuse, and was forgotten until rediscovered during the construction of Fazli Pasha's palace on the same site in the 17th century.

1001 columns
The name "Binbirdirek" means "1001 Columns" in Turkish, although the true number of the columns is only 224. The difference is due to the Turkish expression, "binbir" (i.e. 1001), being a turn of phrase that is often used to express a large sum or array of something.

Gallery

See also

List of Roman cisterns
History of Roman and Byzantine domes

References

Sources
 Kazhdan, Alexander (éd.), (1991). The Oxford Dictionary of Byzantium, 3 vols., Oxford University Press,, s. v. Constantinople, Monuments of : Cisterns, vol. 1, 518-519 ;

Further reading
 

Roman cisterns
Cisterns in Istanbul
Byzantine secular architecture
Fatih